Berghia marcusi is a species of sea slug, an aeolid nudibranch. It is a shell-less marine gastropod mollusc in the family Aeolidiidae.

Distribution
This species is present in western Atlantic Ocean, from Florida to Jamaica and south to Brazil (Rio de Janeiro, São Paulo).

Description
Berghia marcusi has a maximum reported size of 16.6 mm. It is a translucent white animal with a pattern of orange patches on the head and orange lines at the bases of the cerata.

References

External links
 Berghia marcusi in Conquiliologistas do Brasil (in English)

Aeolidiidae
Gastropods described in 2008